Storm Huntley (born 24 February 1987) is a Scottish television presenter.

Early life and education 
Huntley's first name was chosen from a combination of her mother reading a novel where the lead had this name (A Sparrow Falls by Wilbur Smith) and an electrical storm outside on the day she was born. Her grandmother refused to use this name for some time.

As a toddler, she accidentally poured a kettle of boiling water over herself, causing permanent scarring to her arm, shoulder and neck; she chooses clothing to conceal the scars.

Raised in Bishopbriggs in the northern part of Greater Glasgow, she attended Bishopbriggs High School before taking a degree in politics and economics from the University of Glasgow in 2008. She became involved in the university station's Subcity Radio as well as hospital radio, spent time in London with a local community radio company (OnFM) and took a postgraduate diploma in broadcast journalism from the London College of Communication.

Television career
After a period of unpaid work experience, she found work as a researcher with BBC Scotland, became increasingly interested in weather reporting and took a short meteorology course with the Open University.

In June 2014 Huntley joined STV's new local STV Glasgow channel, presenting weather forecasts and features on its evening daily Riverside Show.

Current work
Since 2015, Huntley has been involved in three shows on British terrestrial television - the seasonal CBeebies show Down on the Farm and The Wright Stuff and its replacement Jeremy Vine. Down on the Farm was nominated for a BAFTA Scotland Award in 2016.

On Channel 5's daily live morning phone-in debate programme The Wright Stuff and its 2018 replacement Jeremy Vine, she is a co-host, screening and introducing callers to the hosts Matthew Wright and Jeremy Vine and reading out viewer correspondence.

Personal life
On 30 October 2020, Huntley announced her engagement to Kerr Okan, lead singer of the rock band The LaFontaines.  They married on 2 September 2021 on the banks of Loch Lomond in Scotland.  Fellow television presenter Carol Smillie was the officiating registrar at the wedding. On the 9 September 2021 episode of Jeremy Vine, she announced that following her marriage, her professional name would now be just Storm. Huntley gave birth to their son, Otis, on 11 July 2022.

References

External links

Jeremy Vine official site
Down on the Farm official site
Client profile at DAA Management

1987 births
Alumni of the London College of Communication
Alumni of the University of Glasgow
BBC television presenters
Living people
People educated at Bishopbriggs High School
People from Bishopbriggs
Scottish children's television presenters
Scottish radio presenters
Scottish women radio presenters
Scottish television presenters
Scottish women television presenters
STV News newsreaders and journalists
Scottish women journalists